Carex macrostigmatica is a tussock-forming perennial in the family Cyperaceae. It is native to parts of Siberia.

See also
 List of Carex species

References

macrostigmatica
Plants described in 1903
Taxa named by Georg Kükenthal
Flora of Siberia